The George Wilson Homestead is an historic home which is located in Halfmoon Township, Centre County, Pennsylvania.

It was added to the National Register of Historic Places in 1982.

History and architectural features
The original owner of this home, George Wilson, was a pioneer Quaker settler in the Halfmoon Valley.

Built in 1810, Wilson's home is a two-and-one-half-story, five-bay, limestone and sandstone dwelling with a medium pitch gable roof. The house measures forty feet by twenty-five feet, and was designed in the Georgian style.

A one-and-one-half-story, sixteen square foot addition was built circa 1870. Also located on the property are a number of contributing outbuildings, including a barn, which was erected circa 1820, a carriage shed, a storage garage that was built sometime during the 1930s, a saltbox shed, agable shed, two corn cribs, and an ice house.

It was added to the National Register of Historic Places in 1982.

References

Houses on the National Register of Historic Places in Pennsylvania
Georgian architecture in Pennsylvania
Houses completed in 1810
Houses in Centre County, Pennsylvania
National Register of Historic Places in Centre County, Pennsylvania